The 2018–19 Oberliga season was the 60th season of the Oberliga, the third tier of German ice hockey. The Oberliga operated with two regional leagues, North and South. 25 teams competed in the season that lasted from 21 September 2018 till 30 April 2019. The Tilburg Trappers and EC Peiting won the North and South premierships respectively. EV Landshut was crowned Oberliga champion for winning the playoffs, and by doing so they also secured promotion to DEL2. EHC Waldkraiburg, EC Harzer Falken, and ECC Preussen Berlin were all relegated to the Regionalliga.

Teams

Oberliga North planned to expand to a sixteen team competition for 2018/19. However, those plans did not eventuate when the champions of Regionalliga North (Weserstars Bremen), East (ELV Tornado Niesky) and West (Herforder EV) all declined promotion to Oberliga North. The runners-up of each league also declined to submit an application for a licence. As such, the relegation of EC Harzer Falken was overturned and the team from Braunlage remained in the league. In August 2018, EHC Timmendorfer Strand 06 withdrew from the league and filed for bankruptcy. Oberliga North started the season with 13 teams.

Oberliga South planned to expand to a fourteen-team competition for 2018/19. However, those plans were scrapped when the league was unable to find any suitable candidates in the Regionalliga East, South-West, or Bavaria. Deggendorfer SC left the league after being promoted to DEL2. Regionalliga South-West champion, SC Bietigheim-Bissingen U23 was unable to join the league due to the club having their first team in DEL2. TEV Miesbach also left the league after being relegated the previous season. Joining the league was the recently relegated DEL2 team, Bayreuth Tigers. On 16 May 2018, the DEL2 team SC Riessersee also joined the league after having their DEL2 licence cancelled. SC Riessersee had a protracted negotiation with DEL2 but ultimately was unable to agree to rejoin the league. SC Riessersee then agreed to join Oberliga South for 2018/19. Oberliga South admitted the team with strict conditions, including Riessersee not being able to participate in the championship playoffs and being forced to participate in the relegation playoffs regardless of their regular-season performance. Oberliga South started the season with 12 teams.

Oberliga North

Oberliga North ran from 21 September 2018 till 3 March 2019. The league operated with a 48-match (4 matches against each team) regular season. The top six teams automatically qualified for the championship playoffs. The next four teams advanced to the qualification playoffs, playing for two final spots in the championship playoffs. Teams finishing eleventh to thirteenth had their season end after the regular season. The thirteenth team would be relegated to the Regionalliga. After 26 days into the season, the Hamburg Crocodiles opened insolvency procedures, however, they were allowed to continue to compete during the regular season. The Oberliga board decided to impose the same conditions on Hamburg as they did SC Riessersee, the Crocodiles would be excluded from the championship playoffs. If they finished within the qualification positions, the next team below the qualification positions would take their place.

Regular season

Qualification playoffs

Teams finishing seventh to tenth play best of three match series in the qualification playoffs to determine the final two places from Oberliga North in the Championship playoffs. Due to Hamburg being excluded and finishing ninth, Erfurt Black Dragons, who finished eleventh, progressed to the qualification playoffs instead. The matches occurred between 5 March and 10 March 2020.

Oberliga South

Oberliga South ran from 28 September 2018 till 10 March 2019. The league was broken into two stages. Stage one, the regular season, had all twelve teams compete in a home and away round before splitting into two regional groups for a second home and away round for a total of 32 matches. The top ten teams advanced to the Oberliga South qualification round to determine the league premier and eight qualifiers for the Oberliga championship playoffs. Normally the bottom two teams advanced to the relegation playoffs with eight Bayernliga teams, however, due to SC Riessersee entry conditions to the league, the bottom team and Riessersee would advance to the relegation playoffs.

Regular season

Qualification round

Relegation playoffs

Ten teams took part in the relegation playoffs. Eight Regionalliga teams and two Oberliga teams. The top two teams from the eighteen match playoffs would qualify for the Oberliga in 2019/20. The bottom eight would qualify for the 2019/20 Regionalliga. SC Riessersee topped the playoffs to retain its status as an Oberliga team. EHC Waldkraiburg finished ninth and was relegated from Oberliga. EV Füssen secured promotion to Oberliga after finishing second.

Championship playoffs

The championship playoffs to determine the Oberliga champion and promotion to DEL2. The championship playoffs consisted of eight teams each from North and South who play a best of five series elimination format from the round of 16 to the Oberliga final. EV Landshut won the championship final series 3:2 over Tilburg Trappers to be crowned Oberliga-Meister and secure promotion to DEL2.

References

External links
 Official website
 Elite Prospects home

Oberliga (ice hockey) seasons
2018–19 in German ice hockey